Peru and the United States established relations on May 2, 1826, following Peru's independence from Spain.

According to various global opinion polls, Peruvian public perception of the United States is very positive, with 70% of Peruvians viewing the U.S. favorably in 2015 (compared to 67% in 2002 and 62% in 2005) and 55% of Peruvians viewing American influence positively in 2013. According to the 2012 U.S. Global Leadership Report, 34% of Peruvians approve of U.S. leadership, with 27% disapproving and 39% uncertain.

History

Relations reached their lowest point during the United States invasion of Panama of 1989 when Peru recalled its ambassador in protest of American military actions. However, relations were restored and have recovered and vastly expanded in the decades since.

Peru enjoys strong and cooperative relations with the United States. Relations were strained following the tainted reelection of former President Alberto Fujimori in June 2000, but improved with the installation of an interim government in November 2000 and the inauguration of the government of Alejandro Toledo in July 2001. Under Alan García's administration were positive, and that continued to be the case with the administration of the former president, Pablo Kuczynski.  The United States continues to promote the strengthening of democratic institutions and human rights safeguards in Peru and the integration of Peru into the world economy.

The United States and Peru cooperate on efforts to interdict the flow of narcotics, particularly cocaine, to the United States. Bilateral programs are now in effect to reduce the flow of drugs through Peru's port systems and to perform ground interdiction in tandem with successful law enforcement operations. These U.S. Government-supported law enforcement efforts are complemented by an aggressive effort to establish an alternative development program for coca farmers in key coca growing areas to voluntarily reduce and eliminate coca cultivation. This effort is funded by the Department of State's Bureau for International Narcotics and Law Enforcement Affairs (INL) and the U.S. Agency for International Development (USAID).

U.S. investment and tourism in Peru have grown substantially in recent years. The U.S. is Peru's number one trade partner, and economic and commercial ties will deepen if the U.S.–Peru Trade Promotion Agreement (PTPA) is passed by the U.S. Congress.

About 200,000 U.S. citizens visit Peru annually for business, tourism, and study.  About 16,000 Americans reside in Peru, and more than 400 U.S. companies are represented in the country. The U.S. maintains an embassy in Lima.  There is a U.S. Consular Agency in Cuzco, and the USAID building is located in Lima.  The current U.S. ambassador is Krishna Urs.

The Cuzco Consulate assisted a group of American backpackers who were attacked by Peruvian villagers who suspected the group were "cattle rustlers".

Peru remains part of SICOFAA (whose creation was proposed by the Peruvian Air Force in 1964) and the Rio Pact, requiring it and the U.S. to assist each other in case of attack, and continues to be a regular participant in RIMPAC, an international maritime military exercise led by the U.S. to promote stability throughout the Pacific in the event of potential conflicts ranging from China invading Taiwan or North Korean aggression against its neighbors.

In 2002, nine people died when a car bomb detonated by suspected rebels in the Peruvian capital just days before a visit from American President George W. Bush.

During its time as a non-permanent member of the UN Security Council from 2006 to 2007, Peru (despite having refrained from openly participating in the Global War on Terror itself), alongside the U.S. and the West, repeatedly voted in favor of extending the authorization mandate of the International Security Assistance Force in Afghanistan, and increasing sanctions against Iran over its controversial nuclear program.

The U.S. and Peruvian governments criticized North Korea's 2006 nuclear test; according to an official notice issued by the Peruvian Ministry of Foreign Affairs, "This is a serious event, that violates the effective moratorium for nuclear tests, constitutes a threat to international peace and security and aggravates the tensions in the Korean Peninsula and in the Northeastern Pacific." The note also remarked that, "as a state member of the Security Council, the Government of Peru considers that, in accordance with the Chart of the United Nations, this situation must be examined through the existing multilateral mechanisms". Peru urged North Korea to unconditionally return to the Six-Party Talks and to suspend all activity related to its nuclear program and also reiterated its "firm commitment with non-proliferation efforts, and the suitable mechanisms for the promotion of the strategic stability, international peace and security".

In 2007, Peruvian Foreign Minister José Antonio García Belaúnde said that his country opposes America's occupation of Iraq, and called for the immediate withdrawal of US military forces from that country: "We are against the invasion of Iraq, and hope the military forces will leave that country soon to bring sovereignty back,"  noting the Iraqi situation is very complex and the invasion was a mistake of Washington.

In 2008, Peru joined the U.S. and its allies in recognizing Kosovo, and ultimately refused to recognize South Ossetia and Abkhazia, yet opposed the U.S. and Israel by recognizing Palestine in 2011, claiming "no pressure from any side". In reaction to the Libyan Civil War, Peru became the first country to cut ties with Libya "until the violence against the people ceases" as a result of the aerial bombing of Tripoli. Peru's President Alan García stated, "Peru strongly protests against the repression unleashed by the dictatorship of Muammar al-Gaddafi against the people who are demanding democratic reforms to change the government which has been led for 40 years by the same person." Garcia said that Peru would ask the UN Security Council to establish a no-fly zone over Libya to prevent the use of the country's warplanes against the population.Upon the death of Osama bin Laden in 2011, Garcia credited the death of bin Laden to late and recently beatified Pope John Paul II, saying, "His first miracle was to remove from the world the incarnation of evil, the demonic incarnation of crime and hatred..." He also said that bin Laden's death "vindicates [former U.S. President] George W. Bush's decision to punish Bin Laden and patiently continue this work that has borne fruit".

While Peru's Deputy Foreign Minister José Beraún Araníbar condemned "the excesses committed by the government of Syria" in a 2012 interview, Peru later joined Ecuador and Russia in taking a common stance on the Syrian civil war, with Araníbar stating, "The principle of non-interference has been adopted and advocated by the United Nations and Peru means to keep to it in the Syrian case," also stressing that Peru saw a political dialogue as the only viable means of peace enforcement and supported a joint UN/Arab League initiative to this effect, indicating Peru would not likely support a U.S. intervention.

In June 2013, Peruvian President Ollanta Humala and U.S. President Barack Obama promised to strengthen ties between both nations, including in the fight against narcotics trafficking and in tightening economic ties.

See also

 Foreign relations of Peru
 Foreign relations of the United States
 Embassy of Peru, Washington, D.C.
 Ambassadors of Peru to the United States
 Embassy of the United States, Lima
 Ambassadors of the United States to Peru
 Latin America–United States relations

References

Further reading

 Brands, Hal. "The United States and the Peruvian Challenge, 1968–1975." Diplomacy & Statecraft 21.3 (2010): 471–490. online
 Carey,James. Peru and the United States, 1900-1962 (U of Notre Dame Press, 1964).
 Clayton,	Lawrence. Peru and the United States:	The	Condor and the Eagle" ( U of Georgia	Press, 1999).
 De Ferrari, Gabriella. Gringa Latina: A Woman of Two Worlds (Houghton Mifflin, 1996).
 Jasper, M. L. and C. R. Seelke. "Peru: Political Situation, Economic Conditions and U. S. Relations" (US Congressional Research Service, January 15, 2008) online
 Kofas, Jon V. Foreign Debt and Underdevelopment: U.S.-Peruvian Economic Relations (University	Press of America, 1996).
 McClintock, Cynthia, and Fabián Valias. The United States and Peru: Cooperation at a Cost (Routledge, 2018).
 McClintock, Cynthia, and Fabian Vallas. "The United States and Peru in the 2000s." in Contemporary US-Latin American Relations (Routledge, 2010) pp. 217-237.
 Olson, Richard Stuart. “Economic Coercion in International Disputes: The United States and Peru in the IPC Expropriation Dispute of 1968-1971.” Journal of Developing Areas 9#3 (1975): 395–414.
 Packel, John. "Peruvian Americans." Gale Encyclopedia of Multicultural America, edited by Thomas Riggs, (3rd ed., vol. 3, Gale, 2014), pp. 467–476. online
 Paerregaard, Karsten. “Inside the Hispanic Melting Pot: Negotiating National and Multicultural Identities among Peruvians in the United States.” Latino Studies 3 (2005): 76–96.
 Pike,	Frederick. The United States and the Andean Republics: Peru, Bolivia, and Ecuador (Harvard UP, 1977).
 Roberts, Lauren. "Comparing Theoretical Explanations Regarding United States Decision-Making on Regime Change in Peru and in Chile from 1968 to 1973." (2021).online
 Sharp, Daniel. U.S. Foreign Policy and Peru (U of	Texas Press, 1972).
 Stephenson, Hollie E. "The Pinnacle of United States-Peru Relations: A Survey of the Motivations for and the Ratification Process of the United States-Peru Trade Promotion Agreement." (PhD Diss. Johns Hopkins University, 2008) online, with long bibliography
 Taft–Morales, Maureen.  Peru: Current Conditions and U.S. Relations (US Congressional Research Service, July 21, 2009) online
 Walter,	Richard. Peru	and	the	United States,	1960-1975: How their Ambassadors Managed Foreign	Relations in a Turbulent Era (Pennsylvania State UP, 2010)
 Wordliczek, Rafał. "USAID, Foreign Military Financing, and Total Assistance USAID." Americana'' 11#2 (2015) online

External links
 History of Peru - U.S. relations

 
United States
Bilateral relations of the United States